Marc-Michel Rey (5 May 1720 – 8 June 1780) was an influential publisher in the United Provinces, who published many of the works of the French philosophes, including Jean-Jacques Rousseau.
In his day, he was the largest and most important publisher in the French language in the United Provinces.

Biography

Rey was born in Geneva, Republic of Geneva in 1720, son of French Huguenot parents.
He later wrote that he had little schooling.
He was an apprentice to a Genevan bookseller Marc-Michel Bosquet from 1733 to 1744.
After moving to Amsterdam in 1744, he purchased citizenship and opened a publishing business.

In 1746 he married Elisabeth Bernard, daughter of the bookseller J. F. Bernard, who brought her father's stock with her. The business flourished as a result.

Rey never became fluent in Dutch, but entertained himself lavishly within the French-speaking social circle. He published mainly in French, and most of his sales were in France, although his books were sold in Russia and in the Dutch overseas colonies. Although he was a member of the local Walloon church, he published material that was offensive to the church, including Voltaire's attacks on the priestly order. He was Rousseau's main publisher and also published the works of Diderot. These authors praised him for publishing their books but also accused him of taking most of the profits.

Rey had to deal with pressure from the French, Dutch and Genevan authorities and pastors, but continued to publish controversial books such as Rousseau's Emile and all the works of Baron d'Holbach.
D'Holbach, a prolific atheist, said that Rey profited by his books both financially and from his pleasure in their subject.
He published Jean-Paul Marat's De L'Homme.
At different times, Rey employed Mirabeau and the encyclopedist Abbé Claude Yvon.

Rey died in Amsterdam.

References

Sources

Further reading

 Jeroom Vercruysse, Marc-Michel Rey, libraire des lumières. In : Histoire de l'édition française. II, Le livre triomphant : 1660- 1830, Paris, Promodis, 1984. P. 322-323.
 Jeroom Vercruysse, Typologie de Marc-Michel Rey, Wolfenbütteler Schriften zur Geschichte des Buchwesens, IV, 1981, pp. 167–185.
 Jeroom Vercruysse, Marc-Michel Rey et le livre philosophique. In : Literaturgeschichte als geschichtlicher Auftrag : in memoriam Werner Krauss, Berlin, Akademie-Verlag, 1978, nr 5. pp. 149–156.
 Correspondence of Marc-Michel Rey : 1747-1778. Amsterdam, The Netherlands : Bibliotheek van de Koninklijke Vereniging van het Boekenvak, 1999 (11 microfiches).
 Jeroom Vercruysse, Voltaire et Marc Michel Rey. In : Studies on Voltaire and the eighteenth century ; 58  Vol. 2 (1967) p. 1707-1763. Transactions of the international congress on the Enlightenment = Compte rendu du congrès international sur le siècle des Lumières
 K.R. Gallas, Autour de Marc-Michel Rey et de Rousseau. In : Annales de la Société Jean-Jacques Rousseau, vol. 17 (1926) pp. 73-90.

1720 births
1780 deaths
18th-century businesspeople from the Republic of Geneva
Printers from the Republic of Geneva
Dutch publishers (people)
Defunct publishing companies